The 1968 Florida United States Senate election was marked by the election of the first Republican to the United States Senate from Florida since Reconstruction.

Democratic three-term incumbent George Smathers decided to not seek re-election in order to run for the Democratic presidential nomination.

Popular former two-term Governor LeRoy Collins won the Democratic nomination by defeating State Attorney General Earl Faircloth, while Representative Edward J. Gurney became the Republican candidate.

Gurney was much less well known than Collins, but he won by a margin of over 11%. It is possible that Richard Nixon's victory in the presidential race (including winning Florida) helped Gurney defeat Collins.

References

 OurCampaign article on this race

1968 Florida elections
Florida
1968